Pluvigner is a commune in the Morbihan department of Brittany in north-western France.

Demographics
Inhabitants of Pluvigner are called in French Pluvignois.

At the 1999 census, the town had a population of 5,428. In 2017 the population was 7,543.

Town centre
At the centre of Pluvigner is L'Eglise St Guigner, near which two main squares form the principal shopping district. There are three bakeries, two butchers, clothes shops, a post office, a florist and three bars in the centre. A Super U and Lidl supermarket can be found on the outskirts. There is also a sports complex with football and rugby pitches, tennis courts and a gym.

Breton language
The municipality launched a linguistic plan through Ya d'ar brezhoneg on November the 9th of 2006.

In 2008, there was 9,66% of the children attended the bilingual schools in primary education.

Twin towns
The town is twinned with Cahirciveen, County Kerry, Ireland  since 1984.

See also
Communes of the Morbihan department

References

External links

Official website 

 Mayors of Morbihan Association 

Communes of Morbihan